Jack Absolute Flies Again is a play by Richard Bean and Oliver Chris, based on Richard Brinsley Sheridan’s 1775 play The Rivals, a comedy of manners.

Production 
The play was scheduled to make its world première in the Olivier Theatre at the National Theatre in London for a limited run between 15 April and 25 July 2020, with the performance on Thursday 23 July to be captured live and broadcast to cinemas through National Theatre Live. However, due to the  COVID-19 pandemic, all scheduled performances were cancelled and the production postponed, not joining the repertoire in either 2020 or 2021.

The production was due to be directed by Thea Sharrock, with set and costumes by Mark Thompson, lighting designed by Bruno Poet, music composed by Adrian Johnston with a cast including Caroline Quentin as Mrs Malaprop, James Fleet as Sir Anthony Absolute and Richard Fleeshman as Dudley Scunthorpe.

The production was finally staged in July 2022, with Resident Director Emily Burns directing, and some cast changes including Kelvin Fletcher as Dudley Scunthorpe.

References 

2022 plays
Comedy plays
Plays based on other plays
Plays by Richard Bean
Plays set in England
Plays set in the 1940s